Jorge Escalante (20 July 1940 – 11 June 2007) was a Mexican swimmer and business man who competed in the 1960 Summer Olympics.

References

1940 births
2007 deaths
Mexican male swimmers
Swimmers from Mexico City
Mexican male freestyle swimmers
Olympic swimmers of Mexico
Swimmers at the 1959 Pan American Games
Swimmers at the 1960 Summer Olympics
Pan American Games silver medalists for Mexico
Pan American Games bronze medalists for Mexico
Pan American Games medalists in swimming
Competitors at the 1959 Central American and Caribbean Games
Competitors at the 1962 Central American and Caribbean Games
Central American and Caribbean Games gold medalists for Mexico
Central American and Caribbean Games medalists in swimming
Medalists at the 1959 Pan American Games
20th-century Mexican people
21st-century Mexican people